The Kantishna River (Lower Tanana: Khenteethno) is a  tributary of the Tanana River in the U.S. state of Alaska. Formed by the confluence of the McKinley River with Birch Creek in Denali National Park and Preserve, it drains part of the north slope of the Alaska Range including the Denali massif. The direction of flow is generally north-northeast. The Toklat River is a major tributary.

Boating
Boaters can float the Kantishna River and some of its tributaries in canoes, folding canoes and kayaks, or inflatable canoes and kayaks. Some trips begin at Lake Minchumina, run about  down the Muddy River to Birch Creek, then downstream to the Birch–McKinley confluence (the source of the Kantishna) and then down the Kantishna to the Tanana. The entire trip is rated Class I (easy) on the International Scale of River Difficulty. Dangers include the possibility of dangerous winds on Minchumina Lake, as well as overhanging trees, stumps, and logs along the streams.

Another tributary, Moose Creek, can be floated for about  beginning at Wonder Lake or Kantishna and entering the Kantishna River along its middle reaches near Bearpaw. From there to the Tanana, the run is the same as the Lake Minchumina float. The Moose Creek segment includes Class II (medium) rapids.

See also
List of rivers of Alaska

References

External links

Rivers of Denali Borough, Alaska
Rivers of Alaska
Rivers of Yukon–Koyukuk Census Area, Alaska
Denali National Park and Preserve
Tributaries of the Yukon River
Rivers of Unorganized Borough, Alaska